Billy Earheart (born February 21, 1954) is a Hammond B3 organist and piano player and original member of the Amazing Rhythm Aces. He has also won a Grammy award.
Billy also played piano for Hank Williams Jr. for 21 yrs (1985–2006) and toured with R&B legend Al Green, Eddie Hinton, Memphis Slim, Waylon Jennings, BB King, and others. He has played on over 200 albums.

References

External links
Official Website

American keyboardists
Living people
1954 births